Üçköprü (means "three bridges" in Turkish) is a joining site of Tohumluk Deresi and Kılıçlar Deresi, which are two main tributaries of Yağlıdere stream. It is located in the Giresun highlands in Turkey.

Rivers of Turkey
Rivers of Giresun Province